Lake Lohja may refer to:

Geography

 Lohjanjärvi, a lake in Finland
 Lake Lohja (Estonia), a lake in Estonia